Milestone Bluff is a rock-faced, snow-backed bluff rising to about  just west-southwest of Mount Liotard, in the south part of Adelaide Island, Antarctica. it was so named by the UK Antarctic Place-Names Committee in 1964 because the bluff is an important landmark on the inland route north of Adelaide station.

References

Cliffs of Antarctica
Straits of Graham Land
Landforms of Adelaide Island